Marvel Crosson  (April 27, 1900 – August 19, 1929) was a pioneer aviator, and the first female pilot to earn a commercial license in the Territory of Alaska.  She worked in both California and Alaska, dying in a crash during the first Women's Air Derby.  She was inducted into the Alaska Women's Hall of Fame in 2011.

Early life
She was born to Esler Crosson and his wife Elizabeth Wynant Crosson in Warsaw, Indiana,  the hometown of Elizabeth Crosson. Her brother Joe was born in Minneapolis, Kansas, where the family lived on a ranch. Another sister Zelma was born later.  The family relocated to Sterling, Colorado.

Aviation career
In 1922, the Crosson family moved to San Diego, California. Marvel and Joe became fascinated with aviation and together bought their first airplane, a Curtiss N-9. Joe Crosson moved to the Territory of Alaska to take a job as a pilot. Marvel followed soon afterwards, and earned her commercial pilot's license there, the first woman in the territory to do so. She joined her brother in his business, piloting and keeping the equipment in working order. She helped her brother transport a monoplane from San Diego to New York for Hubert Wilkins. After working as a commercial pilot in Alaska, Marvel returned to California.

Death
Marvel Crosson died on August 19, 1929, when her airplane crashed in the Arizona desert on the second day of the Women's Air Derby that had begun in California. Her body was found several hundred feet from her plane. Crosson's parachute had been released, but was unopened, possibly indicating that she was too near the ground for it to work properly after being released.  She was entombed at Greenwood Memorial Park in San Diego, California.

Race sponsor National Exchange Club held a nationwide moment of silence in all its clubs to commemorate Crosson's death. A vacant chair represented Crosson at a banquet for the Women's Air Derby in Cleveland, Ohio. She was inducted into the Alaska Women's Hall of Fame in 2011.

See also
 Mount Crosson

References

1900 births
1929 deaths
Aviators from Alaska
Aviators from Kansas
Aviators killed in aviation accidents or incidents in the United States
Sports deaths in Arizona
Burials at Greenwood Memorial Park (San Diego)
People from Warsaw, Indiana
People from Minneapolis, Kansas
Commercial aviators
American aviation record holders
American women commercial aviators
American women aviation record holders
Victims of aviation accidents or incidents in 1929
20th-century American women